Eudonia idiogama is a moth in the family Crambidae. It was described by Edward Meyrick in 1935. It is found in the Democratic Republic of the Congo (Orientale Province) and Uganda.

References

Moths described in 1935
Eudonia